Adrian Cochrane-Watson (born 18 February 1967) is an Ulster Unionist Party (UUP) politician who was a Member of the Northern Ireland Assembly (MLA) for South Antrim between 2015 and 2016. He succeeded Danny Kinahan as an MLA for South Antrim, following the former's election to Westminster. At the 2016 election, he failed to retain his seat.

References

1967 births
Living people
Northern Ireland MLAs 2011–2016
People from County Antrim
Ulster Unionist Party MLAs